Following is a list of Iranian writers (in alphabetical order) who are notable for their work.

Persian literature of the 21st century

Persian literature of the 20th century

Writers outside Iran

Contemporary writers

See also
 List of Persian-language poets and authors

References

Writers
Writers
Iranians